Maupas is the name of several communes in France:

 Maupas, Aube, a town in the Aube department
 Maupas, Gers, a town in the Gers department
 Émile Maupas (1842-1916), a French zoologist and a botanist